Kumi African Nation Organization, generally referred to as 415 or Kumi 415 is a predominantly African-American prison gang that was originally formed in Folsom State Prison in the mid-1980s, and the founding members were mainly from the San Francisco Bay Area.

Overview 

Along with the Crips and Bloods, Kumi 415 members have recently provided recruitment pools for the Black Guerrilla Family, a gang with similarly large numbers in the Bay area and Northern California. In the Monterey County Jail, brief alliances have been reported among the Bloods, Crips, and Kumi 415 during period leading up to Stanley Williams' execution.

Kumi is the Swahili word for the number ten, and the sum of 415 is ten. 415 also refers to San Francisco's area code.
They have been reported in:

 Folsom State Prison
 Lerdo County Jail
 Monterey County Jail
 Pelican Bay State Prison
 Pleasant Valley State Prison in Coalinga, California
 Salinas Valley State Prison
 Selected areas across East County, San Diego
 Solano County Jail

Tattoos and culture

Kumi African Nation Organization, also known as 415 or Kumi 415, often incorporate African symbols—including pictures of the continent itself—in their tattoos. For example, a popular tattoo among members of Kumi 415 depicts a yero, or African Warrior, rising up out of an outline of the continent of Africa. In his left hand he holds a machine gun, and in his right he holds a flag bearing the numbers 415. These images reflect the African orientation of both the Black Guerrilla Family and the Kumi African Nation Organization, which both encourage their members to learn Mau Mau history and words drawn from the Swahili language, which they use to communicate with each other in ways that will not be accessible to outsiders.

Notes

References
Organized Crime in California Annual Report to the California Legislature 2004

Organizations established in the 1980s
1980s establishments in California
Prison gangs in the United States
African-American gangs
Gangs in California
Gangs in San Francisco
African-American history in the San Francisco Bay Area